{{Speciesbox
| image = Xylopia frutescens Aubl. - Flickr - Alex Popovkin, Bahia, Brazil (16).jpg
| image_caption = 
| genus = Xylopia
| species = frutescens
| authority = Aubl.
| synonyms = * Xylopia frutescens var. ferruginea R.E.Fr.
 Xylopia frutescens var. glabra S.Watson
 Xylopia meridensis Pittier
 Xylopia polyantha var. nicaraguensis R.E.Fr.
 Xylopia setosa Poir.
 Xylopicrum frutescens (Aubl.) Kuntze
}}Xylopia frutescens is a tree species the genus Xylopia'' and family Annonaceae and its native range is S. Mexico to S. Tropical America.

References

External links 
 
 

Plants described in 1775
frutescens
Trees of Central America
Trees of El Salvador